{{Taxobox
| name = Bulimulus sp. nov. 'vanmoli'
| image =
| status = CR | status_system = IUCN3.1
| regnum = Animalia
| phylum = Mollusca
| classis = Gastropoda
| unranked_superfamilia= clade Heterobranchia
clade Euthyneuraclade Panpulmonata
clade Eupulmonata
clade Stylommatophora
informal group Sigmurethra
| superfamilia = Orthalicoidea
| familia = Orthalicidae
| subfamilia = Bulimulinae
| genus = Bulimulus
| species = B. sp. nov. 'vanmoli'
| binomial = Bulimulus sp. nov. 'vanmoli| binomial_authority =
| synonyms = 
}}Bulimulus'' sp. nov. 'vanmoli'''' is a species of  tropical air-breathing land snail, a pulmonate gastropod mollusk in the subfamily Bulimulinae.

This species is  endemic to Ecuador.  Its natural habitat is subtropical or tropical dry shrubland. It is threatened by habitat loss.

References

Bulimulus
Endemic gastropods of the Galápagos Islands
Undescribed gastropod species
Taxonomy articles created by Polbot
Taxobox binomials not recognized by IUCN